Upper Jaw Glacier is an on a map, the combined shapes of the Upper and Lower Jaw Glaciers resemble a gaping mouth, an idea strengthened by the proximity of Shark Fin.

Glaciers of Scott Coast